A Light for Attracting Attention is the debut studio album by the English rock band the Smile. It was digitally released through XL Recordings on 13 May 2022, with a physical release on 17 June.

The Smile comprises the Radiohead members Thom Yorke and Jonny Greenwood with the drummer Tom Skinner. Yorke provided vocals, and he and Greenwood played guitar, bass and keyboards. The album was produced by Radiohead's longtime producer Nigel Godrich.

The Smile worked during the COVID-19 lockdowns and made their surprise debut in a performance streamed by Glastonbury Festival in May 2021. In early 2022, they released five singles and performed to an audience for the first time at three shows in London in January, which were livestreamed. They began an international tour in May. A Light for Attracting Attention received acclaim and reached number five on the UK Albums Chart.

Background and recording

The Smile comprises the Radiohead members Thom Yorke and Jonny Greenwood with the Sons of Kemet drummer Tom Skinner. They made their debut in a surprise performance for the concert video Live at Worthy Farm, produced by Glastonbury Festival and streamed on May 22, 2021.

The Smile began working on A Light for Attracting Attention shortly before the first UK COVID-19 lockdowns, with Radiohead's longtime producer Nigel Godrich. According to Yorke, Greenwood and Skinner "had already tracked about four things before I even knew what was going on". Yorke wrote the lyrics in his home during the lockdowns; he recorded his vocals to Godrich's studio from his home using streaming software, before his children returned from school each day. Yorke said "It got sort of protracted ... It was deeply frustrating, but it's been the same for everybody." According to Greenwood, the album was almost complete by September 2021.

Yorke performed a Smile song, "Free in the Knowledge", at the Letters Live event at the Royal Albert Hall, London, in October. On January 29 and 30, the Smile performed to an audience for the first time at three shows at Magazine, London, which were livestreamed. Yorke first performed "Skrting on the Surface" in 2009, and in a different arrangement in 2012 with Radiohead. He first performed "Open the Floodgates" solo in 2009.

Composition
Per various critics, A Light for Attracting Attention is an art rock, post-punk, progressive rock, electronica, and Afrobeats album that explores elements of math rock, post-rock, grunge, electro-rock, psychedelic rock desert rock, funk, jazz, breakbeat, wonky,  and systems music. The cover art was created by Yorke with Radiohead's longtime collaborator Stanley Donwood.

Release and promotion 
The Smile's debut single, "You Will Never Work in Television Again", was released to streaming services on 5 January, 2022. On 27 January, they released "The Smoke", followed by "Skrting on the Surface" on 17 March. "Pana-vision", was released on 3 April alongside a new solo song from Yorke, "That's How Horses Are"; both were used in the series finale of the television series Peaky Blinders, broadcast that day. "Free in the Knowledge" was released on 20 April, followed by "Thin Thing" on 9 May. In March, the Smile released a 7-inch vinyl of "You Will Never Work In Television Again" and "The Smoke" through a lottery in independent record stores.

The Smile announced A Light for Attracting Attention on 20 April 2022, alongside the "Free in the Knowledge" single. It was released digitally through XL Recordings on 13 May, with a physical release on 17 June. The Smile began a European tour in May, followed by a North American tour starting in November. They were supported by the saxophonist Robert Stillman, who also joined them for some songs. The tour included performances on The Tonight Show, NPR's Tiny Desk Concerts and KEXP.

In November, the Smile released a special edition of the album through Rough Trade. They also released a limited 10-inch vinyl featuring live tracks and a reading of William Blake's poem "The Smile" by the actor Cillian Murphy, which was used as the introduction for the Smile's live shows. On 14 December, the Smile released a digital-only EP, The Smile (Live at Montreux Jazz Festival, July 2022), with songs from their performance at the Montreux Jazz Festival, Switzerland. It was followed by a limited-edition vinyl EP, Europe: Live Recordings 2022.

Reception 

On Metacritic, A Light for Attracting Attention has a score of 86 out of 100 based on 23 reviews from critics, indicating "universal acclaim". Pitchfork awarded it their "best new music" accolade, with the critic Ryan Dombal writing that it was "instantly, unmistakably the best album yet by a Radiohead side project". In June 2022, Spin named A Light for Attracting Attention the best album of the year so far. The critic Zach Schonfeld wrote that its best moments equalled any of Yorke and Greenwood's work since the 2007 Radiohead album In Rainbows, and that "it almost makes you want to send Radiohead's other three members a sympathy card". In the Guardian, Alexis Petridis named it album of the week, writing that it "may not be head-spinningly different, but is still exceptional".

Uncut named it the best album of the year. Rough Trade named it the best album of the year in their US ranking and the second best album of the year in their UK rating.

A Light for Attracting Attention initially reached number 19 on the UK Albums Chart. After its retail release a month later, it reached number five.

Track listing

Personnel
Credits adapted from album liner notes.

The Smile
 Thom Yorke – vocals (all tracks); synthesiser (tracks 1, 2, 9–12); piano (tracks 1, 4, 8); guitar (tracks 1, 3, 6, 10, 12); bass (tracks 5, 7, 13); vocoder (track 7); sequencer (track 8); acoustic guitar (track 9)
 Jonny Greenwood – synthesiser (tracks 1 and 11); guitar (tracks 1–3, 5, 7, 8, 13); piano (tracks 1, 6, 9); bass (tracks 2–4, 9, 10, 12, 13); keyboards (6); acoustic guitar (track 11); harp (track 6)
 Tom Skinner – drums (tracks 2–7, 9–13); percussion (tracks 2 and 6)

Production
 Nigel Godrich
 Bob Ludwig – mastering

Artwork
 Thom Yorke
 Stanley Donwood

Additional musicians
 London Contemporary Orchestra
 Hugh Brunt – orchestration
 Eloisa-Fleur Thom – violin
 Alessandro Ruisi – violin
 Zara Benyounes – violin
 Sophie Mather – violin
 Agata Daraskaite – violin
 Charlotte Bonneton – violin
 Zoe Matthews – viola
 Clifton Harrison – viola
 Oliver Coates – cello
 Max Ruisi – cello
 Clare O’Connell – cello
 Jason Yarde – saxophone
 Robert Stillman – saxophone
 Chelsea Carmichael – flute
 Nathaniel Cross – trombone
 Byron Wallen – trumpet
 Theon Cross – tuba
 Tom Herbert – double bass
 Dave Brown – double bass

Charts

Weekly charts

Year-end charts

References

2022 debut albums
The Smile albums
Albums produced by Nigel Godrich
XL Recordings albums
Art rock albums by British artists
Progressive rock albums by British artists
Post-punk albums by British artists
Electronica albums by British artists
Afrobeats albums